The 1953 Canada Cup took place June 2–3 at the Beaconsfield Golf Club in Montreal, Quebec, Canada. It was the first Canada Cup event, which became the World Cup in 1967. The tournament was a 36-hole stroke play team event with 7 teams. Each team consisted of two players from a country, except that South African Bobby Locke and Englishman Harry Weetman played as a team. The combined score of each team determined the team results. Play was in pairs, two players from different countries. The Argentine team of Antonio Cerdá and Roberto De Vicenzo won by ten strokes over the Canadian team of Bill Kerr and Stan Leonard. Antonio Cerdá had the lowest individual score. The tournament was sponsored by John Jay Hopkins.

The second Hopkins Trophy match between the United States and Canada was played on the same course from June 5–7. This match was also sponsored by Hopkins and resulted in a 27–18 win for the American team. Bobby Locke and Peter Thomson played for the Canadian team.

Teams

Source

Scores

Source

The leading individual scores were 140 by Antonio Cerdá and 144 by Stan Leonard.

References

World Cup (men's golf)
Canada Cup
Canada Cup
Canada Cup
Canada Cup